Geant4 (for GEometry ANd Tracking) is a platform for "the simulation of the passage of particles through matter" using Monte Carlo methods.  It is the successor of the GEANT series of software toolkits developed by The Geant4 Collaboration, and the first to use object oriented programming (in C++).  Its development, maintenance and user support are taken care by the international Geant4 Collaboration.  Application areas include high energy physics and nuclear experiments, medical, accelerator and space physics studies.  The software is used by a number of research projects around the world.

The Geant4 software and source code is freely available from the project web site; until version 8.1 (released June 28, 2006),  no specific software license for its use existed; Geant4 is now provided under the Geant4 Software License.

Features 
Geant4 includes facilities for handling geometry, tracking, detector response, run management, visualization and user interface.  For many physics simulations, this means less time needs to be spent on the low level details, and researchers can start immediately on the more important aspects of the simulation.

Following is a summary of each of the facilities listed above:
 Geometry is an analysis of the physical layout of the experiment, including detectors, absorbers, etc., and considering how this layout will affect the path of particles in the experiment.
 Tracking is simulating the passage of a particle through matter.  This involves considering possible interactions and decay processes.
 Detector response is recording when a particle passes through the volume of a detector, and approximating how a real detector would respond.
 Run management is recording the details of each run (a set of events), as well as setting up the experiment in different configurations between runs.
 Geant4 offers a number of options for visualization, including OpenGL, Open_Inventor, VRML or VTK and a familiar user interface, based on Tcsh or Qt_(software).

Geant4 can also perform basic histogramming; it requires external analysis tools for exploiting advanced histogramming features.

Since release 10.0, Geant4 implements multithreading, making use of thread-local storage to allow for efficient generation of simulated events in parallel. Geant4 can be installed under a Unix-based operating system such as MacOS, Linux or under Microsoft_Windows.

Some high energy physics experiments using Geant4 
 BES III at BEPCII
 BaBar and GLAST at SLAC
 ATLAS, CMS and LHCb at LHC, CERN
 COMPASS at SPS, CERN
 Borexino at Gran Sasso Laboratory
 DUNE, MINOS, Muon g-2, and Mu2e at Fermilab
 Enriched Xenon Observatory (EXO)
 SNO+
 T2K
 CUORE
 Dark Matter Detectors: SuperCDMS, LUX, LZ, XENON

Applications outside high energy physics 

Because of its general purpose nature, Geant4 is well suited for development of computational tools for analysing interactions of particle with matter in many areas. These include:
 Space applications where it is used to study interactions between the natural space radiation environment and space hardware or astronauts;
 Medical applications where interactions of radiations used for treatment are simulated.
 Radiation effects in microelectronics where ionizing effects on semiconductor devices are modeled.
 Nuclear physics

See also 
 CLHEP and FreeHEP, libraries for high energy physics. 
 Methodical Accelerator Design, for modelling the charged particles in the rest of the accelerator.

References

External links 
 

Experimental particle physics
Free science software
Free software programmed in C++
Monte Carlo particle physics software
Physics software
CERN software